The 1981 Giro di Lombardia was the 75th edition of the Giro di Lombardia cycle race and was held on 17 October 1981. The race started in Milan and finished in Como. The race was won by Hennie Kuiper of the DAF Trucks team.

General classification

References

1981
Giro di Lombardia
Giro di Lombardia